Valdosta is a city in and the county seat of Lowndes County, Georgia, United States. As of 2019, Valdosta had an estimated population of 56,457.

Valdosta is the principal city of the Valdosta Metropolitan Statistical Area, which in 2021 had a population of 149,590. It includes Brooks County to the west.

Valdosta is the home of Valdosta State University, a regional university in the University System of Georgia with over 12,000 students. The football team at Valdosta High School has more wins than any other American high school, and is second in overall wins in the country after University of Michigan.

Valdosta is called the Azalea City, as the plant grows in profusion there. The city hosts an annual Azalea Festival in March.

History

Establishment
Valdosta was incorporated on December 7, 1860, when it was designated by the state legislature as the new county seat, formerly at nearby Troupville. The railroad was built to Valdosta that year, rather than Troupville, stimulating development in the new county seat. The engine known as Satilla No. 3 pulled the first train into Valdosta on the Atlantic and Gulf Railroad on either July 4, 1860 or on July 20, 1860.

Valdosta is located on the Gulf Coastal Plain of Georgia and has a virtually flat landscape. It was once the center of long-staple cotton growing in the United States, a lucrative crop both before and after the Civil War. The county had a majority-white population well before the war with a substantial black population, as the cotton plantations were dependent on masses of enslaved field laborers.

The  of railway between Valdosta and Waycross were once the longest straight stretch of railroad in the world. Today, highways stretch through the county for miles with hardly a curve, rise, or fall.

After being bypassed by the railroad and losing the county seat, Troupville was virtually abandoned. It had been named after Governor George Troup, for whom Troup County, Georgia, was also named. Valdosta was named after Troup's plantation, Valdosta (occasionally the "Val d'Osta" spelling was used for the plantation). Troup had named it after the Aosta Valley in Italy. The name Aosta (Latin: Augusta), refers to Emperor Augustus. A long-standing rumor held that the city's name meant "vale of beauty."

1861 to 1899
The American Civil War erupted just months after the establishment of Valdosta. During the war, Valdosta was far away from battles and became a refuge for those fleeing areas of Georgia where the war was being actively fought.

After the Civil War, during the Reconstruction era, more than 100 freedmen, families of farmers, craftsmen, and laborers, emigrated from Lowndes County to Arthington, Liberia, in 1871 and 1872, looking for a better life. Since before the war, the American Colonization Society had supported the relocation of free blacks to Liberia, an American colony in West Africa established for this purpose. The first group from Lowndes County left in 1871, and were led by Jefferson Bracewell; the second group was led in 1872 by Aaron Miller. Many freedmen ended up working as sharecroppers and tenant farmers on area plantations in Lowndes County, as cotton agriculture continued well into the 20th century.

One notable event during Reconstruction was at a political meeting in front of the courthouse. A carpetbagger named J. W. Clift was running for Congress and was looking for support from former slaves. During Clift's speech he verbally attacked whites of Valdosta. In response five men planted explosives at the courthouse, planning on setting them off at Clift's next political rally. When other whites arrived at the courthouse unaware of the explosives the five men decided to stop the explosives but some still managed to go off. The explosion was small and no injuries occurred. The five men were arrested and were going to go on trial, but federal soldiers took them to Savannah for trial, which was seen by residents as an overreach of authority and an endangerment for self-government.

As mechanization was introduced, the number of agricultural jobs decreased and Valdosta became more industrialized by the 20th century. The world's second Coca-Cola bottling plant began bottling Coca-Cola in Valdosta in 1897. In 1899, the cotton mill town of Remerton was established  from the center of Valdosta. It has since become an enclave to the growth of Valdosta around Remerton.

First half of the 20th century

A new courthouse was planned in 1900 to replace the smaller courthouse. Construction began in 1904 for around $75,000. The old courthouse was torn down in March 1904. The new courthouse was completed in 1904, and on April 14, 1905, the first session of court took place in the new courthouse.

In November 1902, the Harris Nickel-Plate Circus' prize elephant, Gypsy, went on a rampage and killed her trainer James O'Rourke. After terrorizing the town for a couple of hours, she ran off to Cherry Creek, north of Valdosta. Gypsy was chased by Police Chief Calvin Dampier and a posse. Gypsy was shot and killed and buried on site. James O'Rourke was buried in Sunset Hill Cemetery in Valdosta.

On July 28, 1907, Valdosta voted to become a dry city; a record $10,000 worth of whiskey was sold on the last day. The city had been wet since its founding.

In 1910, cotton was still important to the economy, and Fortune magazine ranked Valdosta as the richest city in America by per capita income. Soon after that, the boll weevil invaded the South, moving east through the states and killing much of the cotton crop in this area in 1917. Agriculture in this area turned to tobacco and pine timber. In January 1913, the South Georgia State Normal College opened in Valdosta on the edge of town. Over the course of the following century, it evolved into Valdosta State University. The school gradually became a regional center of higher education that has drawn many to the city.

On May 16, 1918, a white planter named Hampton Smith was shot and killed at his house near Morven, Georgia, by a black farm worker named Sidney Johnson who was routinely mistreated by Smith. Johnson also shot Smith's wife but she later recovered. Johnson hid for several days in Valdosta without discovery. Lynch mobs formed in Valdosta ransacking Lowndes and Brooks counties for a week looking for Johnson and his alleged accomplices. These mobs lynched at least 13 African Americans, among them Mary Turner and her unborn eight-month-old baby who was cut from her body and murdered. Mary Turner's husband Hazel Turner was also lynched the day before.

Sidney Johnson was turned in by an acquaintance, and on May 22 Police Chief Calvin Dampier led a shootout at the Valdosta house where he was hiding. Following his death, a crowd of more than 700 castrated Johnson's body, then dragged it behind a vehicle down Patterson Street and all the way to Morven, Georgia, near the site of Smith's murder. There the body of Johnson was hanged and burned on a tree. That afternoon, Governor Hugh Dorsey ordered the state militia to be dispatched to Valdosta to halt the lynch mobs, but they arrived too late for many victims. Dorsey later denounced the lynchings, but none of the participants were ever prosecuted.

Following the violence, more than 500 African Americans fled from Lowndes and Brooks counties to escape such oppressive conditions and violence. From 1880 to 1930, Brooks County had the highest number of lynchings in the state of Georgia. By 1922 local chapters of the Ku Klux Klan, which had been revived starting in 1915, were holding rallies openly in Valdosta.

Second half of the 20th century

Moody Air Force Base's role in World War II and the postwar era has influenced the growth of Valdosta.

The local economy received an important boost in the mid-20th century when Interstate 75 was routed and built through the area. Many vacationers on their way to Florida found Valdosta a convenient "last stop" on their way to Walt Disney World and the Orlando area. The Interstate's route to the west of the city has contributed to its commercial district shifting from the historic downtown area to near the Interstate.

Valdosta State College was integrated in September 1963. In 1969, Valdosta High School (the formerly all-white school) and Pinevale High School (the formerly all-black school) were merged into one system. Integration had begun at Valdosta High School about 1966.

During the Vietnam War, future president George W. Bush entered the National Guard, receiving flight training at Valdosta's Moody Air Force Base in November 1968.

In 1994 Kent and Dawn Buescher opened Liberty Farms Animal Park with a playground, entertainment venue and a collection of animals. An amusement park was added, and in 1996 Liberty Farms Animal Park was renamed Wild Adventures. Wild Adventures expanded with Splash Island Water Park in 2002. The Buescher family purchased a botanical garden and theme park called Cypress Gardens in 2004. Due to damage from three hurricanes and a financial struggle in repairing Cypress Gardens the Buescher family were forced to sell Wild Adventures to Herschend Family Entertainment in 2007.

According to the Bureau of Labor Statistics' Monthly Labor Review, the first automated teller machine (ATM) was installed at a C&S Bank in Valdosta in 1971. That ATM was preceded by one installed in Rockville Centre, New York, in 1969.

21st century
Valdosta was named as one of 2003's "Top 100 U.S. Small Towns" by Site Selection magazine. In 2010 Valdosta was named one of the "Best Small Places For Business and Careers" by Forbes.

Geography

The Withlacoochee River, a tributary of the Suwannee River, runs along part of the western edge of the city, while the eastern side of the city drains to Mud Creek, flowing southeast to the Alapahoochee River, also part of the Suwannee River watershed.

Climate
Valdosta has a humid subtropical climate (Köppen climate classification: Cfa), with mild, dry/wet winters and hot, humid summers. Snowfall is rare but not unknown. Snow fell in Valdosta most recently on January 3, 2018, but the last significant snowfall happened in 1989. However, light frosts regularly occur between December and February. Valdosta can experience Indian summers in the winter, where temperatures can get quite warm. Very rarely do winter lows go below .

Demographics

MSA
According to the Bureau of Census, the Valdosta, Georgia Metropolitan Statistical Area (MSA) had an estimated population of 135,804 and ranked #281 in the U.S. in 2009. (The MSA consists of Lowndes, Brooks, Lanier and Echols counties.)

City

2010 census

As of the census of 2010 and estimates from 2005 to 2009, there were 54,518 people, 20,280 households, and 11,876 families residing in the city. There were 22,709 housing units available in Valdosta. The racial makeup of the city was 51.2% African American, 41.5% White, 0.3% Native American, 1.7% Asian, 0.1% Pacific Islander, 1.2% from other races, and 1.9% from two or more races. Hispanic or Latino of any race were 4.0% of the population.

According to the census of 2000 the largest self-reported ancestry groups in Valdosta were:
· Black or African American - 51%
· English - 9%
· Irish - 7%
· German - 6%
· Scotch-Irish - 2%
· Italian - 2%

There were 20,280 households, out of which 27.4% had children under the age of 18 living in them, 35.5% were married couples living together, 19.3% had a female householder with no spouse present, and 41.4% were non-families. 28.4% of all households were made up of individuals, and 7.4% had someone living alone who was 65 years of age or older. The average household size was 2.35 and the average family size was 2.93.
In the city, the population was spread out, with 30% 19 years of age and younger, 19.3% from 20 to 24, 23.2% from 25 to 44, 18.3% from 45 to 64, and 9.4% who were 65 years of age or older. The median age was 25.5 years. 53.1% of the population of Valdosta was female and 46.9% was male. Females 18 and over made up 54.4% of the population compared to 45.6% male.

The median income for a household in the city was $31,940, and the median income for a family was $39,295. Males had a median income of $33,230 versus $25,689 for females. The per capita income for the city was $19,003. About 20.3% of families and 28.2% of the population were below the poverty line, including 34.3% of those under age 18 and 13.1% of those age 65 or over.

2020 census

As of the 2020 United States Census, there were 55,378 people, 21,153 households, and 11,224 families residing in the city.

Economy

Located in the far southern portion of the state, near the Florida line along the Interstate 75 corridor, it is a commercial center of South Georgia with numerous manufacturing plants. The surrounding area produces tobacco, naval stores, particularly turpentine, as well as pine lumber and pulpwood. According to the Georgia Department of Community Affairs, Valdosta is called the "Naval Stores Capital of the World" because it supplies 80% of the world demand for naval stores.

In the retailing field, Valdosta has one major regional mall, Valdosta Mall, which features national chain anchor stores like JCPenney, Bed, Bath & Beyond, Buckle, PetSmart, Belk, Old Navy, and Ross Stores. Several large stores surround the mall or are near the mall, including Best Buy, Home Depot, Kohl's, Lowe's, Office Max, Target, and Publix. Valdosta has other notable shopping areas such as the Historic Downtown area with many local businesses, and the Five Points area which has a Big Lots, Winn-Dixie, and numerous national franchise and local restaurants.

Wild Adventures is owned by Herschend Family Entertainment.

Arts and culture

Public libraries 

The South Georgia Regional Library operates two libraries in Valdosta: Valdosta Lowndes County Library and Mae Wisenbaker McMullen Memorial Southside Library. Built for $450,000, it first opened in 1968. The Mae Wisenbaker McMullen Memorial Southside Library opened on May 31, 1992. An area businessperson, J.C. McMullen, donated the land used for the Southside Library, which was built as part of a larger library construction program; it was named after Mae Wisenbaker McMullen, the mother of J.C. McMullen.

The first library for African-Americans in Lowndes County began operations in the Walton Building on January 21, 1935, closed in February 1939, and reopened in 1955. In 1963 all libraries became available to patrons of all races.

Museum

The Lowndes County Historical Society & Museum is located at the Carnegie Library of Valdosta, a National Register of Historic Places listed building and Carnegie library, one of 24 Carnegie libraries in Georgia.

Civic center
The Lowndes County Civic Center is a 120-seat multi-purpose arena that can be rented by the public and is often used to host community sporting events. The arena was also an occasional venue for Southern Championship Wrestling and Spinebusters Championship Wrestling.

LGBTQ community

The South Georgia Pride Festival is held every third Saturday in September. The first festival was held in 2008 on the front lawn of Valdosta State University. In 2009, the festival became South Georgia Pride and held its festival at the John W. Saunders Park in Valdosta in 2010. Valdosta Mayor John J. Fretti proclaimed September 17, 2011, as South Georgia Pride Day.  Since 2010, the festival has grown to over 3,000 people attending. In July 2012, Mayor John Gayle refused to give a proclamation to South Georgia Pride, the only one he has refused.

Sports

Minor league baseball
Valdosta hosted several different minor league baseball teams during the twentieth century, and was one of six cities in the Georgia State League which began play in 1906, with the team known as the Valdosta Stars. From 1946 to 1958, the Valdosta Tigers were a "Class-D" minor league team. Valdosta was also home to the Valdosta Trojans which was a "farm" team for the Brooklyn Dodgers.

ESPN's Titletown, USA
TitleTown USA was a month-long segment on ESPN that started in the spring of 2008 and continued through July. Fans nominated towns and cities across the country based on their championship pedigree. A panel reviewed the nominees, and fan voting in May determined the 20th finalist. SportsCenter visited each city in July, and fan voting July 23–27 determined the winner. Due to the Valdosta High School football team's record as well as multiple championships in many sports by Valdosta State University, Lowndes High School, Valwood School, Georgia Christian School, and other academic institutions in the town, Valdosta was nominated as a finalist in 2008 for ESPN's "Titletown USA" contest. On July 28, 2008, with 29.2% of fan votes on ESPN's website poll, Valdosta was named TitleTown USA.

Education

Public schools 
The Valdosta City School District holds grades pre-school to grade twelve, consisting of five elementary schools, two middle schools, and one high school. The school district serves the city of Valdosta and the surrounding communities of Lowndes County.  the district has 447 full-time teachers and over 7,178 students.

The Lowndes County School District serves communities of Lowndes County outside of the Valdosta city limits.

Scintilla Charter Academy is a free public school of choice open to any student who resides in Lowndes county or the city of Valdosta. SCA holds grades kindergarten to grade Seven.

Private schools 
Valwood School is an independent college preparatory school north of Valdosta enrolling students in Pre-Kindergarten through twelfth grade. Several Christian schools offering grades K-12 also operate in and near Valdosta, including Crossroads Baptist School, Georgia Christian School, Lighthouse Christian School, Open Bible Christian School, Highland Christian Academy, St. John Catholic School, and Victory Christian School.

Higher education 
Valdosta is the home of Valdosta State University (VSU), founded in 1906 as South Georgia State Normal College for Women. It became part of the University System of Georgia in 1950 as Valdosta State College. It achieved university status and became VSU in 1993 and is one of two regional universities in Georgia.

An extension of Georgia Military College is in the city limits, and Wiregrass Georgia Technical College is located a mile outside of the city limits off Interstate 75.

Also located in Valdosta is Embry-Riddle Aeronautical University-Worldwide: Moody Campus.

Media

Newspaper
The Valdosta Daily Times

Radio
AM:
WJEM 1150 AM; 5 kW Gospel
WVLD 1450 AM; 1 kW Rock (Rock 106.9) 
WGUN 950 AM; 4 kW Adult Urban Contemporary
WRFV 910 AM; 50 kW

FM:
WDDQ TALK 92.1 FM Talk radio
WAYT 88.1 FM Christian Contemporary (licensed to Thomasville)
WVVS 90.9 FM VSU station
WWET 91.7 FM (Georgia Public Broadcasting)
WAAC 92.9 FM Country
WJYF 95.3 FM Christian Contemporary
WQPW 95.7 FM Adult Contemporary
WJEM 96.1 (repeater of 1150 AM)
WGOV-FM 96.7 FM Urban
WAFT 101.1 FM Christian
WXHT 102.7 FM Pop Hits (Broadcast from Valdosta but licensed to Madison, Florida)
WSTI 105.3 FM Classic Soul and R&B (Broadcast from Valdosta but licensed to Quitman)
 W295AO 106.9 Rock (repeater of WVLD 1450AM)
WWRQ 107.9 FM The Beat

Television
Valdosta and Lowndes County is part of the Tallahassee, Florida, television market and receives most channels from that city; it also receives some channels from the neighboring Albany market. See :Template:Tallahassee TV and :Template:Albany GA TV.

 WSWG channel 44 is the local CBS affiliate licensed to Valdosta and based in Moultrie. The station serves the Valdosta and Albany areas, and includes subchannels offering programming from MyNetworkTV and Me-TV.
 WXGA-TV channel 8 is the local GPB outlet, licensed to Waycross.

Infrastructure

Transportation

Major highways
 Interstate 75 (State Route 401) runs north to south through a western section of Valdosta, with access from  Exits 11 through 22. I-75 leads north  to Tifton and southeast  to Lake City, Florida.
 U.S. Highway 41 (State Route 7) runs north to south entering the city at the Withlacoochee River being known as North Valdosta Road, and continuing south on North Ashley Street. It branches into two sections at Five Points, US 41 Business / SR 7 Business traveling south down North Ashley Street, US 41 Alternate / SR 7 Alternate traveling south down Patterson Street. At the overpass over the CSX railroad, they join to become US 41 Business / SR 7 Business following South Patterson Street. 
 U.S. Highway 84 (Wiregrass Georgia Parkway) is colocated with State Route 38 and runs west to east bisecting the city and is known as Hill Avenue through the city limits. US 84 leads northeast  to Waycross and west  to Thomasville.
 U.S. Highway 221 follows US 84 and SR 38 west of Valdosta and State Route 31 northeast of Valdosta. US 221 leads west with US 84  to Quitman and northeast  to Lakeland.

Other transportation
There is also a Greyhound bus station.

Pedestrians and cycling
 Azalea City Trail
 VSU Walking Trail System

Streetcar
 In 1898, the Valdosta Street Railway Company secured the right to operate streetcars on Patterson, Ashley, Toombs, Lee, Hill, Central, Crane and Gordon streets. Valdosta was one of the smallest cities in America to have a street railway system. The streetcar operated in the downtown area between 1899 and 1924. The abandoned tracks were removed in the 1940s to be used as scrap metal for the war effort.

Intercity rail
For several decades the Atlantic Coast Line and the Southern Railway ran regular passenger trains on a Chicago to Florida circuit, making stops in Valdosta, albeit at different stations. The Atlantic Coast Line ran the South Wind through Valdosta, and the Southern operated the Ponce de Leon and the Royal Palm through the town.

After Amtrak assumed passenger rail operations in the United States in 1971 it operated the Floridian from Chicago to St. Petersburg and Miami. In a group of several train disestablishments in 1979, Amtrak discontinued the Floridian, thus marking the last time that passenger trains served south Georgia (excepting the New York-Florida service in eastern Georgia).

Notable people

  Michelle Anderson, president of Brooklyn College and a scholar on rape law
  Alex W. Bealer, Atlanta blacksmith and author; born in Valdosta in 1921
  Alfred Corn, poet and essayist; raised in Valdosta
  Doc Holliday, Western dentist, gunfighter and gambler; spent his youth in Valdosta
  Louis Lomax, African-American journalist and the son of a leading local educator
  James Lord Pierpont, composer of "Jingle Bells"; lived many years in Valdosta, where he taught music
  Elsie Quarterman, plant biologist and professor of biology at Vanderbilt University; born in Valdosta in 1910
  Mary Turner, African-American lynching victim

Entertainment
  Rhett Akins, country artist, two-time Songwriter of the Year, member of the Peach Pickers writing trio and his son, Thomas Rhett, country music artist
  Don Fleming, indie rock musician and producer
  From First to Last (Matt Good, Derek Bloom and Travis Richer), post-hardcore band
  Ben Hayslip, two-time Country Music Songwriter of the Year. Member of The Peach Pickers along with Valdosta native Rhett Akins
  Bill Hicks, comedian; born in Valdosta
  Ty McLane, young entrepreneur; and co-manager at a successful funeral home “Carson Mclane Funeral services”. 
  NewSong, Christian band
  Margaret Pardee, violinist and violin teacher
  Pauley Perrette, actress best known for NCIS; attended Valdosta State University
  Billy Joe Royal, country music and pop artist; born in Valdosta
  Sonny Shroyer, actor best known for role as Enos Strate on The Dukes of Hazzard; born in Valdosta
  Domonique Simone, adult film star
  Demond Wilson, minister and TV actor best known for playing Lamont on Sanford and Son
 William Workman, opera singer

Sports

  Briny Baird, professional golfer on PGA Tour and Nationwide Tour
  Buck Belue, former Valdosta High School standout and quarterback of the University of Georgia's 1980 national championship team, now a radio talk show host
  Dusty Bonner, VSU quarterback, later played for Kentucky, NFL's Atlanta Falcons and arena football league
  Dana Brinson, former NFL player
  Vincent Burns, NFL defensive tackle (Indianapolis Colts)
  Lorenzo Cain, MLB center fielder
  Ellis Clary, former Major League Baseball (MLB) player, coach, and scout
  Buck Coats, former MLB player
  Pepper Daniels, baseball player in the Negro leagues
  William "Red" Dawson, only surviving coach of the 1970 Marshall tragedy, chronicled in the movie We Are Marshall
  Harris English, professional golfer on the PGA Tour
  Dot Fulghum, played in MLB for the Philadelphia Athletics in 1921
  Willie Gary, NFL, St. Louis Rams, played in Super Bowl XXXVI
  Randall Godfrey, NFL linebacker, Dallas Cowboys, Seattle Seahawks and San Diego Chargers
  DL Hall, MLB prospect and former first-round pick
  Brice Hunter, NFL wide receiver, Tampa Bay Buccaneers
  Sean Kazmar Jr., former MLB player
  Malcolm Mitchell, NFL wide receiver, New England Patriots
  Kenny Moore, NFL player
  Todd Peterson, former NFL player
  Jay Ratliff, NFL nose tackle, Dallas Cowboys, Chicago Bears
  Greg Reid, former Florida State and Valdosta State football player, now plays for Arena Football League team, Tampa Bay Storm
  Desmond (Desi) Relaford, MLB infielder
  Stan Rome, NFL player, Kansas City Chiefs (1979–1982)
  Coleman Rudolph, football player, Georgia Tech and NFL's New York Giants and Jets
  Glenn Schumann, football coach who is currently the co-defensive coordinator and inside linebackers coach for the Georgia Bulldogs
  Telvin Smith, NFL linebacker, played for Florida State Football, before being drafted to the Jacksonville Jaguars

Politics
  Allen Boyd, served as a Democrat in the U.S. House of Representatives from Florida from 1997 to 2011
  Charlie Norwood, served as a Republican congressman from Georgia from 1995 to 2007
  Melvin E. Thompson, the 71st governor of Georgia, retired and died in Valdosta

Valdosta in fiction
Parts of Fannie Flagg's novel Fried Green Tomatoes at the Whistle Stop Cafe and the 1991 film based upon the novel are set in Valdosta.
In Allen Steele's science fiction novel Coyote Frontier, Valdosta in the year 2070 is the site of Camp Buchanan, an internment camp for dissident liberal intellectuals.
Scenes from Ernest in the Army take place in Valdosta, even though the entire film was shot in South Africa.
Scenes from the film Zombieland, starring Woody Harrelson, were shot on Valdosta streets and at nearby Wild Adventures theme park.
In Cotton Patch Gospel, Joe moves Jesus and the rest of the family to Valdosta when Herod dies.
The Lady Chablis performed in Valdosta in the novel Midnight in the Garden of Good and Evil by John Berendt.
The 1986 movie As Summers Die starring Bette Davis and Jamie Lee Curtis was filmed in Valdosta.
In John Steinbeck's novel East of Eden, Adam Trask stops in Valdosta to steal supplies and request money from his brother Charles after escaping from a Florida chain gang on his way back to Connecticut.
In the movie The Further Adventures of Tennessee Buck, the title character claims that they are heading towards "the roughest country this side of Valdosta, Georgia".
One of the opening sketches of the second episode of the first season of the sketch comedy series Mr. Show with Bob and David features a Dixiecrat senator, played by Bob Odenkirk, attending a folk festival in Valdosta and ordering it shut down when he decides the featured exhibits are too suggestive.

References

External links

City of Valdosta official website
Valdosta  at New Georgia Encyclopedia
South Georgia Historic Newspapers Archive, Digital Library of Georgia

 
Cities in Georgia (U.S. state)
Cities in Lowndes County, Georgia
County seats in Georgia (U.S. state)